Repedea (Ukrainian and Rusyn: Кривий) is a commune in Maramureș County, Maramureș, Romania. It is composed of a single village, Repedea.

At the 2011 census, 96.7% of inhabitants were Ukrainians, 2.2% Romanians and 0.3% Roma. At the 2002 census, 63.6% were Ukrainian Orthodox, 31.3% Pentecostal, 3.3% Seventh-day Adventist and 0.9% Reformed.

References

Communes in Maramureș County
Localities in Romanian Maramureș
Ukrainian communities in Romania